Diphyllocalyx is a genus of flowering plants belonging to the family Verbenaceae.

Its native range is Cuba.

Species:

Diphyllocalyx armatus 
Diphyllocalyx cayensis 
Diphyllocalyx galanus 
Diphyllocalyx myrtifolius 
Diphyllocalyx nipensis 
Diphyllocalyx urquiolae

References

Verbenaceae
Verbenaceae genera